Matt Jones  is a Canadian politician who was elected in the 2019 Alberta general election to represent the electoral district of Calgary-South East in the 30th Alberta Legislature. Jones was appointed Minister of Children's Affairs on June 21, 2022.

Electoral history

References

United Conservative Party MLAs
Living people
Politicians from Calgary
21st-century Canadian politicians
Year of birth missing (living people)